Radix rubiginosa is a species of air-breathing freshwater snail, an aquatic pulmonate gastropod in the family Lymnaeidae, the pond snails.

This species is sometimes treated as a subspecies of Radix auricularia.

Distribution
This species occurs in its native range in:
 Indo-China
 Indonesia
 Vietnam - it was firstly identified in Vietnam in 2013 in southern Vietnam.

It occurs as an introduced "hothouse alien" in:
 Great Britain
 Ireland

Description

The shape of the shell is elongated and cylindrical. The shell has 5 whorls.

The aperture is moderately expanded. The width of the aperture is 4–5 mm. The height of the aperture is 7–11 mm.

The width of the shell is 5–8 mm. The height of the shell is 11–20 mm.

Habitat
This species inhabits small canals.

Parasites
Parasites of Radix rubiginosa include:
 Radix rubiginosa is the first intermediate host for Hypoderaeum conoideum
 Fasciola gigantica
 Echninoparyphium dunni and Echinostoma audyi
 Pleurolophocercous cercariae (Heterophyidae) were recorded from Radix rubiginosa in China.

Human use
This species is sold in the ornamental pet trade as an item for freshwater aquaria.

References

External links 

 ZipcodeZooinfo: 

Lymnaeidae
Gastropods described in 1831